The 1985 RTHK Top 10 Gold Songs Awards was held in 1985 for the 1984 music season. This is the first ceremony to offer the "Golden Needle Award".

Top 10 song awards
The top 10 songs (十大中文金曲) of 1985 are as follows.

Other awards

References
 RTHK top 10 gold song awards 1985

RTHK Top 10 Gold Songs Awards
Rthk Top 10 Gold Songs Awards, 1985
Rthk Top 10 Gold Songs Awards, 1985